"The Way Love Goes" is a song recorded by Canadian country music artist Jamie Warren. It was released in 1998 as the second single from his second studio album, Just Not the Same. It peaked at number 10 on the RPM Country Tracks chart in November 1998.

Chart performance

References

1998 songs
1998 singles
Jamie Warren songs